The Arado Ar 233 was a 1940s German design for a civil twin-engined amphibian flying boat, developed by Dewoitine in France under the control of Arado Flugzeugwerke.

Design and development
The Ar 233 was a twin-engined flying-boat with room for ten passengers. It would have been powered by either two BMW 323 or BMW 801 engines. A retractable tricycle landing gear would have allowed amphibious operation. A mockup was completed by Dewoitine in German-occupied France, but the project was abandoned due to the Liberation of France in 1944.

General history of the Aircraft
The Arado Ar 233 was intended for civilian use only but, later on in the development process, the Germans wanted to weaponize it and make it suitable for combat. Some aircraft firms that worked for the axis power, were thinking about post war German civil aircraft early in the 1940s, in accordance with a request made by the RLM or the ministry of aviation. Some examples of aircraft designed for Germany for future civilian use are the Fw 206 and the BV 144. The Arado firm responded with their own two engine float plane design because of the Fw 206 and BV 144. The Ar 233 project began around August and was bearing the designation of "E 430" It originally had two variants. the first variant is a Bramo 323 R2 powered seaplane model that is capable of transporting ten passengers. The other variation was the Argus Ar 204, which was scrapped for in favor of the much more superior Bramo 323 R2.

Specifications (proposed)

See also

References

Citations

Bibliography

1940s German civil utility aircraft
Ar 233
Flying boats
Amphibious aircraft
Dewoitine aircraft
Abandoned civil aircraft projects
Twin piston-engined tractor aircraft